Mission is an unincorporated community in Sussex County, Delaware, United States. Mission is located along state routes 24 and 30, southwest of Millsboro.

References

Unincorporated communities in Sussex County, Delaware
Unincorporated communities in Delaware